Carácuaro de Morelos is a town in the Mexican state of Michoacán. It serves as the municipal seat for the surrounding municipality of Carácuaro.

Toponomy
The word "Carácuaro" comes from the Chichimeca word carakua, meaning "place of slope" or "place on the slope". "Morelos" refers to José María Morelos, a prominent revolutionary during the Mexican War of Independence.

Demographics
In the 2020 census, Carácuaro de Morelos had 4,149 inhabitants, which represents an average increase of 1.3% per year in the 2010-2020 period based on the 3,653 inhabitants registered in the previous census. It occupies an area of 2,418 km2, with a density of 1,716 inhabitants/km2.

In 2010, it was classified as a locality with a high degree of social vulnerability.  The population of Carácuaro de Morelos is mostly literate (8.10% of illiterate people as of 2020) with a schooling level of more than 7.5 years. Only 0.29% of the population recognizes itself as indigenous.

References

Populated places in Michoacán